Tafalofefe Hospital is a Provincial government funded hospital in the Mnquma Local Municipality area outside Butterworth, Eastern Cape in South Africa.

The hospital departments include Emergency department, Ophthalmology, Out Patients Department, Surgical Services, Medical Services, Operating Theatre & CSSD Services, Pharmacy, Anti-Retroviral (ARV) treatment for HIV/AIDS, Post Trauma Counseling Services, NHLS Laboratory, Laundry Services, Kitchen Services and Mortuary.

References
Eastern Cape Department of Health website - Amathole District Hospitals

Hospitals in the Eastern Cape
Amathole District Municipality